Tsumugi (つむぎ) is a 2004 Japanese film. 

Tsumugi may also refer to
Risa Tsumugi (born 1996), Japanese voice actress, DJ, rapper and singer 
Tsumugi Kotobuki, a fictional character in the Japanese manga series K-On!
Tsumugi Shirogane, a fictional character from the Danganronpa series 
Tsumugi (cloth), a traditional cloth made from slub silk 
Kumejima-tsumugi, a Japanese craft of silk cloth
Yūki-tsumugi, a variety of silk cloth produced in Japan